Acer Gemstone series is multimedia/gaming laptop range from Acer. Acer Gemstone Blue series includes features such as Blu-ray optical device, DDR3 memory module etc.

This series consist of mainly four notebook models.

 6935G
 8930G
 6920G
 8920G

Other variations of these models exist such as the 8930.

References 

Acer Inc. laptops
Gaming laptops